State Route 217 (SR 217) is a  route that serves as a connection between Eight Mile and Citronelle through western Mobile County.

Route description
The southern terminus of SR 217 is located at its intersection with US 45 in Eight Mile. From this point, the route travels in gradual loop towards the northwest before turning towards the northeast en route to its northern terminus with Mobile County Road 21 (CR 21) southwest of Citronelle. Along its route it is known as Lott Road throughout its entire length.

Major intersections

References

External links

Alabama Department of Transportation county road maps for Mobile (Adobe Acrobat reader required for maps; enlargement of maps necessary for legibility)
Alabama 217 Ends
Alabama 217 at Southeastroads.com

217
Transportation in Mobile County, Alabama